Phil William Klein (born April 30, 1989) is an American former professional baseball pitcher. He played in Major League Baseball (MLB) for the Texas Rangers and Philadelphia Phillies; and in Nippon Professional Baseball (NPB) for the Yokohama DeNA BayStars.

Career
Klein played college baseball at Youngstown State University from 2008 to 2011.

Texas Rangers
He was drafted by the Texas Rangers in the 30th round of the 2011 Major League Baseball Draft.

Klein was called up to the major leagues for the first time on August 1, 2014. He made his first career start on May 20, 2015 against Boston. He pitched 5 innings while allowing 1 run and striking out 4 batters with a win.

Philadelphia Phillies
Klein was claimed off waivers by the Philadelphia Phillies on June 19, 2016. He was then optioned to Triple-A Lehigh Valley. He was called up to the Phillies on August 3 and was the starting pitcher the same night. Klein was released by the Phillies on December 14, 2016, to pursue an opportunity to play baseball in Asia.

Yokohama DeNA BayStars
Klein signed with the Yokohama DeNA BayStars of Nippon Professional Baseball for the 2017 season. He became a free agent after the 2017 season.

References

External links

Youngstown State Penguins bio

1989 births
Living people
Baseball players from Columbus, Ohio
Major League Baseball pitchers
Texas Rangers players
Philadelphia Phillies players
Youngstown State Penguins baseball players
Arizona League Rangers players
Spokane Indians players
Hickory Crawdads players
Myrtle Beach Pelicans players
Frisco RoughRiders players
Round Rock Express players
Lehigh Valley IronPigs players
Nippon Professional Baseball pitchers
Yokohama DeNA BayStars players
American expatriate baseball players in Japan